Theodore Raymond Speers (born January 28, 1961) is an American retired professional ice hockey player who played four games in the National Hockey League (NHL) with the Detroit Red Wings during the 1985–86 season. The rest of his career, which lasted from 1983 to 1987, was spent in the American Hockey League. Before turning professional Speers spent four years playing for the University of Michigan.

Career statistics

Regular season and playoffs

Awards and honors

References

External links 
 

1961 births
Living people
Adirondack Red Wings players
American men's ice hockey centers
Detroit Red Wings players
Ice hockey people from Ann Arbor, Michigan
Undrafted National Hockey League players